{{Taxobox
| image =
| image_caption =
| regnum = Fungi
| divisio = Ascomycota
| classis = Dothideomycetes
| ordo = Incertae sedis
| familia = Asterinaceae
| genus = Morenoina
| genus_authority = Theiss.
| type_species = Morenoina antarctica| type_species_authority = (Speg.) Theiss.
| subdivision_ranks = Species
| subdivision =
}}Morenoina''' is a genus of fungi in the Asterinaceae family. The relationship of this taxon to other taxa within the class is unknown (incertae sedis), and it has not yet been placed with certainty into any order.

Species
As accepted by Species Fungorum;

 Morenoina aframomi 
 Morenoina antarctica 
 Morenoina arundinariae 
 Morenoina australis 
 Morenoina azorica 
 Morenoina byrsonimae 
 Morenoina calamicola 
 Morenoina chamaecyparidis 
 Morenoina clarkii 
 Morenoina dracaenae 
 Morenoina epilobii 
 Morenoina festucae 
 Morenoina fimbriata 
 Morenoina graphoides 
 Morenoina inaequalis 
 Morenoina lucens 
 Morenoina microscopica 
 Morenoina minuta 
 Morenoina palmicola 
 Morenoina paludosa 
 Morenoina parvula 
 Morenoina phragmitis 
 Morenoina pteridiicola 
 Morenoina rhododendri 
 Morenoina selaginellae 
 Morenoina websteri 

Former species:
 M. africana  = Echidnodella africana Asterinaceae
 M. serpens  = Echidnodes serpens'' Asterinaceae

References

External links
Index Fungorum

Asterinaceae